The Little Cafe (French: Le petit café) is a 1919 French silent comedy film directed by Raymond Bernard and starring Max Linder, Armand Bernard and Joffre. It was based on the 1911 play The Little Cafe by Tristan Bernard.

Synopsis
After inheriting a large sum of money, a Parisian waiter has to keep working in a cafe to honour his contract to his unscrupulous employer. While working there, he falls in love with his employer's daughter.

Cast
 Max Linder as Albert 
 Armand Bernard as Bouzin 
 Joffre as Philibert 
 Wanda Lyon as Yvonne 
 Flavienne Merindol as Edwige 
 Halma as Bigredon 
 Major Heitner as Pianiste Tzigane 
 Andrée Barelly as Bérangère d'Aquitaine 
 Henri Debain as Le plongeur

References

Bibliography
 Bradley, Edwin M. The First Hollywood Musicals: A Critical Filmography Of 171 Features, 1927 Through 1932. McFarland, 2004.

External links

1919 films
French comedy films
French silent feature films
1919 comedy films
1910s French-language films
Films directed by Raymond Bernard
French films based on plays
Films set in Paris
French black-and-white films
Pathé films
Silent comedy films
1910s French films